(1798–1851) was a Japanese samurai and naturalist of the late Edo period. He is known for his accurately illustrated works on the flora and fauna of Japan, which include the multi-volume .

See also

 Ono Ranzan

References

1798 births
1851 deaths
19th-century Japanese botanists
Japanese zoologists
Samurai